The  is a group of Kofun to early Nara period  burial mound located in the Takatsuki neighborhood of the city of Nagahama, Shiga Prefecture  in the Kansai region of Japan. It was designated a National Historic Site of Japan in 2003. It is the largest kofun cluster in Shiga Prefecture.

Overview
The Kohori Kofun Cluster extends along a three kilometer ridge running north-to-south on Nishinoyama hill facing Shiotsu Bay at the northern end of Lake Biwa. The ridge has an elevation of 200 to 240 meters, and is 100 meters above the surface of Lake Biwa. The cluster consists of seven keyhole-shaped , having one square end and one circular end, when viewed from above, eight "two conjoined rectangles" type, one scallop-shaped , 79 circular-type  and 37 square-type for a total of 132 tumuli. These have been divided by archaeologists into six groupings labelled "Group A" through "Group F" during a survey in 1965. The largest is the Nishinoyama Kofun, which has a total length of 90 meters. Most of the circular and square mounds are from 10 to 20 meters in diameter or on each side, with the largest at no more the 30 meters.

The larger zenpō-kōen-fun and zenpō-kōhō-fun are estimated to date from the early Kofun period, or around the beginning of the 3rd century AD. This has been verified by an excavation of the Komatsu Kofun from 1998 to 2000, from which numerous grave goods were recovered, including much earthenware, bronze mirrors and copper and iron products. No haniwa have been recovered from any of the tumuli in the cluster, but fukiishi have been found on some of the earlier tombs. The smaller circular and square tombs date to as late as the early 7th century AD, or into the early Nara period.

The site is unusual not only in the number of tumuli, but in the variety of styles. In addition, although it is on the major highway from the Yamato region to the Sea of Japan, the kofun are visible only from Lake Biwa, indicating that the builders had a strong connection to water transportation on the lake. The site is about ten minutes by car from Takatsuki Station on the JR West Hokuriku Main Line.

See also
List of Historic Sites of Japan (Shiga)

References

External links
Shiga Prefecture Department of Education 

Kofun
Archaeological sites in Japan
History of Shiga Prefecture
Nagahama, Shiga
Historic Sites of Japan